Yang Pu (born 30 March 1978 in Beijing) is a Chinese football manager and former player, He is currently the head of Youth department of Beijing Guoan.

He played his entire professional football career for Beijing Guoan as a holding midfielder, left back and left winger where he was also their captain. As an international player he represented the Chinese national team and was a participant at the 2002 FIFA World Cup squad where he played in two matches.

Club career
Yang Pu started his professional football career for Beijing Guoan in the 1998 league season and due to versatility to also play as a midfield he would quickly become a squad regular. By the 2000 league season he had firmly established himself as their first choice left-back and became an integral member of the team. Despite several management changes he would remain a loyal member to the club and win his first piece of silverware with the 2003 Chinese FA Cup. His loyalty to the club would pay-off when he was named as their captain in the 2007 league season, however due to injury he rarely actually captained the team. At the end of the 2009 league season Yang Pu retired due to a persistent right knee injury, however despite this he was able to lead Beijing Guoan to the league title even though he missed much of the league season.

International career
Yang Pu made his senior international debut in friendly against his ancestral country North Korea on August 3, 2001 in a 2-2 draw. Though predominantly a left back or left midfielder he was used was in a variety of positions for the Chinese football team and this versatility quickly saw him become a regular within the squad. Increasingly pushing for a place in the Chinese starting line-up he would be a participant at the 2002 FIFA World Cup and even play in two group games. With the introduction of Sun Xiang and Yan Song he saw his time limited within the team and he would play his last game against Kuwait on October 13, 2004 in a Fifa World Cup qualifier that China lost 1-0.

Honours

Player
Beijing Guoan
Chinese Super League: 2009
Chinese FA Cup: 2003
Chinese Football Super Cup: 2003

References

External links
2002 China Team Player Profile at BBC website

Player stats at Football-lineups.com

1978 births
Living people
Chinese footballers
Chinese football managers
Footballers from Beijing
Beijing Guoan F.C. players
Chinese Super League players
China international footballers
Association football defenders
Association football midfielders
Association football utility players
2002 FIFA World Cup players
Beijing Guoan F.C. non-playing staff